University Park Airport  is a public airport in Benner Township, Centre County, Pennsylvania, serving State College and Bellefonte. The airport covers 1,091 acres (442 ha) and has one active runway.

The airport is owned by The Pennsylvania State University, but the terminal building and parking areas are owned and operated by the Centre County Airport Authority. It is currently served by United Express, Delta Connection, and American Eagle, connecting to hubs in the Northeast, Southeast, and Midwest.

History

In the 1950s a small airport was built on land leased from Penn State, just north of State College. The Centre County Airport Authority was created to manage the development of the airport. The October 1959 chart shows 2350-foot runway 6; the August 1965 chart shows 3000 feet; the November 1967 chart adds 2350-foot runway 16. (The intersection of those two 50-foot runways is still visible at ). The present runway was built parallel to the old runway 6 about 1975–76; it was then 5000 feet long.

The first airline flights (All American DC-3s) at State College were at the old airport southwest of town  from 1949 to 1951. In 1965 Harrisburg Commuter began flights from State College to Harrisburg, two flights each weekday; the 1965 Official Airlines Guide does not state which airport they served, but starting in 1978 Allegheny Commuter flights were at University Park.

Penn State assumed the lease and assets of the airport in 1972.  A permanent passenger terminal was built in 1985. A new passenger terminal was completed in 1993, and cargo operations moved to the old terminal. In 1997 the runway was lengthened to 6,701 ft (2,042 m). A new general aviation hangar was built in 2001.

Construction on the control tower began on January 8, 2010 and was completed in early August 2011. The Airport Traffic Control Tower (ATCT) went operational on September 1, 2011, and is operated by Midwest Air Traffic Control under the Federal Contract Tower Program.

The U.S. Department of Transportation says in 2019 there were 190,930 enplanements, making University Park Airport the 6th busiest airport in Pennsylvania.

Services
The Centre County Airport Authority owns and operates the commercial airline terminal. The terminal consists of a snack bar, free Wi-Fi, charging stations for mobile devices and a conference room. Taxi, limousine services and car rentals are available. The airport does not have jet bridges, and all aircraft board from ground-level hardstands.

Penn State University fixed-base operator (FBO), offers fuel, flight planning services, aircraft repair, and hangar rental. Delta Air Lines is serviced by SkyWest Airlines, United Airlines is serviced by CommutAir and Air Wisconsin, and American Airlines is serviced by Piedmont Airlines. Private aircraft are serviced by fixed-base operator Penn State Aviation Center.

Runways 
University Park Airport features one active runway. The end closest to Rock Road is Runway 24, bearing a magnetic heading of 243 degrees. Runway 24 is equipped with an ILS and is used as the primary landing and departing runway. Runway 6 is used as a visual runway; however, infrastructure has been considered to improve satellite-based approaches. Runway 16 and 34 was formerly used for general aviation but was closed; it is now used as a taxiway.

Aircraft 
University Park Airport regularly operates Bombardier CRJ200s, Embraer ERJ145s and members of the Airbus A320 family as commercial aircraft; De Havilland Canada Dash 8s were common until their replacement by the regional jets. Cessna 208 Caravans are operated by Wiggins Airways contracted under FedEx Express cargo flights. Wiggins services Pittsburgh International Airport. Geisinger operates an Airbus H145 helicopter as a LifeFlight service. The airport sees numerous general aviation aircraft; Piper PA-28 Cherokees and business jets are common, while larger aircraft up to Boeing 757s can be seen as charter jets.

Airlines and destinations

Passenger

Cargo

Statistics

Top destinations

Annual Traffic

Military 

University Park Airport is home to Civil Air Patrol Nittany Composite Squadron PA-338. The squadron operates a Cessna 182 Skylane registered as N848CP.

The United States Army and Air National Guard occasionally fly Sikorsky UH-60 Black Hawk helicopters and Lockheed C-130 Hercules aircraft into UNV for training missions. Aircraft such as the F/A-18 Hornet and A-10 Thunderbolt II have staged at the airport to participate in flyovers of Beaver Stadium.

U.S. Presidents have flown into University Park Airport aboard Boeing C-32s operating as Air Force One.

References

External links

Pennsylvania Bureau of Aviation: University Park Airport
Penn State University Aviation Center (Airport FBO and General Aviation Terminal)

Airports in Pennsylvania
Pennsylvania State University
State College, Pennsylvania
Transportation buildings and structures in Centre County, Pennsylvania
University and college airports